Zvonimir Hölbling (born 3 August 1989) is a Croatian male badminton player who plays for the Medvedgrad 1998 badminton club and also BV Mülheim in Germany.

Personal life
He was educated at the University of Zagreb Faculty of Electrical Engineering and Computing.

Career 
Zvonimir started playing badminton at age 10 and competed in various junior international tournaments throughout his teenage years where he achieved a lot of great results that put him to the top of the European junior circuit ranking. Since his junior days, he has had a lot of great results and won tournaments in men's doubles on the international tour with his partner Zvonimir Đurkinjak. He competed at the 2013 Mediterranean Games in Mersin, where he won gold medal in men's doubles tournament making a historic success for Croatian badminton. In 2015, he competed at the European Games in Baku, Azerbaijan.

Achievements

Mediterranean Games
Men's Doubles

BWF International Challenge/Series
Men's Doubles

 BWF International Challenge tournament
 BWF International Series tournament
 BWF Future Series tournament

National championships
2009 – men's doubles with Igor Čimbur
2010 – men's doubles with Igor Čimbur
2011 – men's doubles with Igor Čimbur
2012 – men's doubles with Igor Čimbur
2015 – mixed doubles with Matea Čiča
2016 – mixed doubles with Matea Čiča

References

External links
 

Croatian male badminton players
1989 births
Living people
Sportspeople from Zagreb
Badminton players at the 2015 European Games
European Games competitors for Croatia
Mediterranean Games gold medalists for Croatia
Competitors at the 2013 Mediterranean Games
Mediterranean Games medalists in badminton
21st-century Croatian people